Tomokazu Murakami (May 25, 1906 – February 13, 1987) was the 6th Chief Justice of Japan (1973–1976). He was a graduate of the University of Tokyo. He was a recipient of the Order of the Rising Sun. He was born in Fukuoka Prefecture.

Bibliography
山本祐司『最高裁物語（上・下）』（日本評論社、1994年）（講談社+α文庫、1997年）

1906 births
1987 deaths
Chief justices of Japan
Japanese prosecutors
Grand Cordons of the Order of the Rising Sun
University of Tokyo alumni
People from Fukuoka Prefecture